Dianella is a little-known genus of small freshwater snails with a gill and an operculum, aquatic gastropod molluscs in the family Hydrobiidae.

Distribution
These are European freshwater snails; they occur in southeastern Europe, from northern Italy, through the Balkans, to the Black Sea and the Caspian Sea

Description
Their relatively big shell has an onic or turriform shape with a common, prominent, spiral sculpture. The radula shows a rhachidian tooth with no basal cusps. Their stomach has a caecal appendix at its pyloric end. They have a Hydrobia-like central nervous system, a simple penis and a characteristic, big seminal receptacle at the end of a prominent spiral of the coiled oviduct.

Species 
Species within the genus Dianella include:
 † Dianella gracilis (Pavlović, 1903) 
Dianella schlickum Schütt, 1962
Dianella thiesseana Kobelt, 1878
Species brought into synonymy
 † Dianella crassa (Burgerstein, 1877): synonym of  † Prososthenia crassa Burgerstein, 1877 
 † Dianella nodosa (Burgerstein, 1877): synonym of  † Prososthenia nodosa Burgerstein, 1877 
 † Dianella reticulata (Burgerstein, 1877): synonym of  † Prososthenia reticulata Burgerstein, 1877 
 † Dianella suessi (Burgerstein, 1877): synonym of  † Prososthenia suessi Burgerstein, 1877

References

 Gude, G.K. (1913). On some preoccupied molluscan names (generic and specific). Proceedings of the Malacological Society of London. 10, 292-293. page(s): 292

Hydrobiidae